The Deutscher Tanzpreis (German Dance Prize) is a prestigious prize for artistic dance in Germany. It has been awarded annually since 1983.

The Deutscher Berufsverband für Tanzpädagogik awarded the prize until 2012. From 2013 to 2017, it was awarded by an association, Förderverein Tanzkunst Deutschland. In 2017 the German Dance Prize was handed over to the Dachverband Tanz Deutschland e.V. (DTD) as sponsor. The Dachverband realizes the award ceremony in close cooperation with the city of Essen. It is awarded to personalities who earned special merits regarding the artistic dance in Germany. From 2005 to 2016, an additional award, Zukunft (Future) has been given to promising young artists in the categories female dancer, male dancer and choreographer. An additional Anerkennungspreis (Prize of acknowledgement) has been given for special merits from 2005 to 2016.

Recipients

German Dance Prize

 1983: Gret Palucca
 1983: Tatjana Gsovsky
 1984: Kurt Peters
 1985: Gustav Blank
 1986: Heinz Laurenzen
 1987: José de Udaeta
 1988: John Neumeier
 1989: Marcia Haydée
 1990: 
 1991: Konstanze Vernon
 1992: Horst Koegler
 1993: Hans van Manen
 1994: Maurice Béjart
 1995: Pina Bausch
 1996: 
 1997: Philippe Braunschweig
 1998: Birgit Keil
 1999: Uwe Scholz
 2000: Fritz Höver
 2001: Hans Werner Henze
 2003: 
 2004: William Forsythe
 2005: Hans Herdlein
 2006: Reid Anderson
 2007: Susanne Linke
 2008: John Neumeier
 2009: Heinz Spoerli
 2010: Georgette Tsinguirides
 2011: Egon Madsen
 2012: 
 2013: 
 2014: 
 2015: 
 2016: Martin Puttke
 2018: Nele Hertling     
 2019: 
 2020: Raimund Hoghe
 2021: 
 2022: Marco Goecke and

Award for outstanding artistic developments in dance
 2018: Ballett des Staatstheaters Nürnberg
 2019: Jo Parkes / Mobile Dance
 2020: Antje Pfundtner in Gesellschaft (APiG) and Raphael Hillebrand
 2021: Claire Cunningham and Ursula Borrmann
 2022: Verein Aktion Tanz

Award for outstanding performer
 2018: Meg Stuart and her Company Damaged Goods
 2019: Isabelle Schad
 2020: Friedemann Vogel
 2021: Adil Laraki

Lifetime Achievement Award
 2022: Reinhild Hoffmann

Recipients of Deutscher Tanzpreis Zukunft 
From 2005 to 2015 (with a break in 2008), the German Dance Prize "Future" was also awarded to up-and-coming artists who "have already attract attention"
 2005: Polina Semionova, Flavio Salamanca (dance), Thiago Bordin (choreography)
 2006: Alicia Amatrian, Jason Reilly (dance),  (choreography)
 2007: , Marian Walter (dance), Terence Kohler (choreography)
 2008: no award
 2009: Marijn Rademaker (dance)
 2010: Iana Salenko (dance)
 2011: Daniel Camargo (dance), Eric Gauthier (choreography)
 2012: Gözde Özgür (dance)
 2013: Bundesjugendballett Hamburg
 2014: Demis Volpi (choreography)
 2015: Elisa Badenes (dance)
 2016: Marcos Menha (dance); Andrey Kaydanovskiy (choreography)

Anerkennungspreise 
 2005: Royston Maldoom (choreography, dance teacher)
 2007: Uschi Ziegler
 2010: Susanne Menck & Christine Eckerle
 2011: Achim Thorwald
 2013: Tobias Ehinger (Ballet manager)
 2014: Nina Hümpel
 2015: Ricardo Fernando (choreography, ballet director)
 2016: Elisabeth Exner-Grave, Liane Simmel, Eileen M. Wanke (dance medical professionals)

References

External links 
 
 Website des Fördervereins Tanzkunst Deutschland e.V. (obsolete page in German)

Dance awards
Awards established in 1983
Dance in Germany